Galih Firmansyah (born 22 March 1986 in Malang, East Java, Indonesia) is an Indonesian Professional footballer for Liga 1 club Arema.

Club career

Perserang Serang
He was signed for Perserang Serang to play in Liga 2 in the 2018 season.

References

External links
 Galih Firmansyah at Soccerway
 Galih Firmansyah at Liga Indonesia

1986 births
Living people
Sportspeople from Malang
Association football goalkeepers
Indonesian footballers
Liga 1 (Indonesia) players
Persiwa Wamena players
21st-century Indonesian people